William George Middleton (1920–1951) was an Australian rugby league footballer who played in the 1940s.

Bill 'China' Middleton was a St. George junior player from the Kogarah Wanderers Club. He was graded in 1942 and played two years of first grade. 

Middleton played right through the 1940s in the lower grades at St. George and after retiring, he was elected on the Club Committee. 

He is not to be confused with a North Sydney player with the same name during the same era. 

Middleton died suddenly on 2 May 1951 at Kogarah, New South Wales, age 31. Leading Sydney Jockeys got together on Sunday 10 June 1951 at Prince Alfred Park at Carlton, New South Wales in a goal kicking challenge to raise money for Bill's wife and young family.

References

1920 births
1951 deaths
Australian rugby league players
Rugby league players from Sydney
Rugby league five-eighths
St. George Dragons players